Sean-Nós Nua is the sixth studio album by Irish singer Sinéad O'Connor, released on 8 October 2002, by Vanguard Records. It consists of traditional Irish songs, the title meaning "new old-style" and also referring to the popular style of traditional Irish music sean-nós.

Track listing

Personnel 
Sinéad O'Connor – vocals
Dónal Lunny – acoustic guitar, bouzouki, keyboards, bodhran, backing vocals
Steve Wickham – fiddle (except tracks 7, 12 and 13), mandolin, banjo
Sharon Shannon – accordion on track 9
Alan Branch – percussion on track 12
Abdullah Chhadeh – quanun
Nick Coplowe – Hammond organ
Pete Lockett – percussion (except tracks 1, 9, 12 and 13)
Cora Venus Lunny – violin on tracks 1, 3, 5, 6 and 7, Viola tracks 1 & 9
Kieran Kiely – keyboards, accordion
Joanie Madden – low and high whistle on tracks 2, 7, 8, 9 & 13
Skip McDonald – electric guitar, backing vocals
Christy Moore – vocals and guitar on track 12 
Carlton "Bubblers" Ogilvie – drums, bass guitar, piano
Bernard O'Neill – bass
Professor Stretch – drums, programming

Charts

See also
Goodnight, Thank You, You've Been a Lovely Audience – a 2003 live video album by O'Connor which features a documentary on the making of this album

References

External links
 

2002 albums
Sinéad O'Connor albums
Vanguard Records albums
Irish-language albums
Folk albums by Irish artists
Albums produced by Adrian Sherwood